Dolné Lefantovce is a village and municipality in the Nitra District in western central Slovakia, in the Nitra Region.

Geography
The village lies at an altitude of about 160 metres and covers an area of 4.613 km². It has a population of about 540 people.

Facilities
The village has a football pitch and a library.

See also
 List of municipalities and towns in Slovakia

References

Genealogical resources
The records for genealogical research are available at the state archive "Statny Archiv in Nitra, Slovakia"
 Roman Catholic church records (births/marriages/deaths): 1720-1940 (parish B)

External links
 
 
https://web.archive.org/web/20080111223415/http://www.statistics.sk/mosmis/eng/run.html
Surnames of living people in Dolne Lefantovce

Villages and municipalities in Nitra District